Medžitlija (Macedonian: Меџитлија) is a village in the municipality of Bitola, North Macedonia, along the border with Greece. It used to be part of the former municipality of Bistrica. The village is located 14 km south of Bitola at the Medžitlija-Níki border crossing.

History 
The village exists since the end of the 19th century, when it belonged to the Kazas of Monastir in the Ottoman Empire. Medžitlija was populated by Turks until the 1950s - 1960s when almost all migrated to Turkey and sold their properties to Albanians from the nearby village of Kišava. According to the census of 2002, the village has 155 inhabitants.

Demographics
According to the 2002 census, the village had a total of 155 inhabitants. Ethnic groups in the village include:

Albanians 154 
Macedonians 1

References

External links
 Location

Villages in Bitola Municipality
Albanian communities in North Macedonia